The 2017–18 All-Ireland Junior Club Hurling Championship is the 15th staging of the All-Ireland Junior Club Hurling Championship, the Gaelic Athletic Association's junior inter-county club hurling tournament. The championship began on 1 October 2017 and ended on 4 February 2018.

The All-Ireland final was played on 4 February 2018 at Croke Park in Dublin, between Ardmore from Waterford and Fethard St. Mogue's from Wexford, in what was their first ever meeting in the final. Ardmore won the match by 3-11 to 0-18 to claim their first ever championship title. This was their first All-Ireland title in the grade.

Fethard's Mark Wallace was the championship's top scorer with 0-59.

Connacht Junior Club Hurling Championship

Connacht semi-final

Connacht final

Leinster Junior Club Hurling Championship

Leinster first round

Leinster quarter-finals

Leinster semi-finals

Leinster final

Munster Junior Club Hurling Championship

Munster quarter-finals

Munster semi-finals===

Munster final

Ulster Junior Club Hurling Championship

Ulster quarter-finals

Ulster semi-finals

Ulster final

All-Ireland Junior Club Hurling Championship

All-Ireland quarter-final

All-Ireland semi-finals

All-Ireland final

Championship statistics

Top scorers

Overall

Miscellaneous

 Séamus Prendergast's total score of 5-20 is the highest ever by a player in a single Munster Championship campaign.
 The All-Ireland semi-final between Ardmore and Setanta, originally scheduled for 21 January, was postponed due to adverse weather conditions.

References

All-Ireland Junior Club Hurling Championship
All-Ireland Junior Club Hurling Championship
2017